Khisa (/khi-sɛ/ or /khi-sa/), also known as Komono, Khi Khipa and Kumwenu, is a Gur language of the Ivory Coast and Burkina Faso. It is listed as threatened by the Endangered Languages Project due to many speakers preferring Jula for economic and educational reasons.

References

Gur languages
Languages of Burkina Faso
Languages of Ivory Coast